Manuel Geier (born 8 January 1988) is an Austrian professional ice hockey forward currently playing for EC Wölfe Zeltweg in the Austrian fourth tier (Aut.4).

Geier most notably played 13 seasons with EC KAC in the ICE Hockey League (ICEHL).
He participated with the Austrian national team at the 2015 IIHF World Championship.

References

External links

1988 births
Living people
Austrian ice hockey forwards
People from Judenburg
EC KAC players
Sportspeople from Styria